Khaled Gharsellaoui (born 29 July 1990) is a Tunisian footballer who as a midfielder for Saudi Arabian club Arar.

References

External links
 
 

1990 births
Living people
Tunisian footballers
Tunisian expatriate footballers
EGS Gafsa players
Espérance Sportive de Tunis players
Dhofar Club players
ES Métlaoui players
Stade Gabèsien players
Al-Shoulla FC players
US Ben Guerdane players
Wej SC players
Arar FC players
Tunisian Ligue Professionnelle 1 players
Oman Professional League players
Saudi First Division League players
Saudi Second Division players
Expatriate footballers in Oman
Expatriate footballers in Saudi Arabia
Tunisian expatriate sportspeople in Saudi Arabia
Association football midfielders